Nate McConnell is a Democratic member of the Montana State Senate. He was previously part of the Montana House of Representatives, representing House District 89. He was first elected in 2014 and was reelected in 2016.

Early life, education, and career
McConnell earned his J.D. from Southern Illinois University and became a sole practitioner in Missoula, Montana.

Montana House of Representatives

In the 2014 primary, he defeated two fellow Democrats and faced no Republican opposition. In 2016, he defeated Republican Alex Krigsvold.

McConnell was selected to serve as a Democratic whip in November 2016.

Montana Senate
In January 2018, Cynthia Wolken was named deputy director of the Montana Department of Corrections, and formally resigned from the Montana Senate in February 2018. McConnell was appointed by the Missoula County Commission to replace Wolken in the Montana Senate and was sworn in in March 2018.

References 

Year of birth missing (living people)
Living people
Democratic Party members of the Montana House of Representatives
Place of birth missing (living people)
21st-century American politicians